Julian Sands (born 4 January 1958) is an English actor. He is known for his roles in films such as The Killing Fields, A Room with a View, Warlock, Arachnophobia, Boxing Helena, and Leaving Las Vegas. On television, he is known for playing Vladimir Bierko in 24, Jor-El in Smallville, and Yulish Rabitov in Banshee. 

On 13 January 2023, Sands went missing while hiking in the San Gabriel Mountains northeast of Los Angeles. , he has not been located.

Career
Julian Sands began his film career appearing in supporting roles in films, including Oxford Blues (1984) and The Killing Fields (1984). He also had a cameo as a Greek soldier in the BBC adaptation of The Box of Delights in 1984. He was cast as the romantic lead in the 1985 film A Room with a View. In 1985, following the success of A Room with a View and Ken Russell's Gothic (1986) Sands decided to move to Hollywood and pursue a career in American films. He appeared in several of them—both lower-tier and higher-budget.

He played the title role in the horror film Warlock (1989) and its sequel Warlock: The Armageddon (1993), the role of Franz Liszt in Impromptu (1991), the role of Yves Cloquet in Naked Lunch (1991), and prominent roles in Arachnophobia (1990), Boxing Helena (1993) and Leaving Las Vegas (1995). He played Erik, aka the Phantom in the 1998 horror-film version of The Phantom of the Opera. He starred opposite Jackie Chan in the action-comedy film The Medallion (2003). He played Laurence Olivier in BBC Four's In Praise of Hardcore (2005), a drama about the critic and impresario Kenneth Tynan.

In television work, he voiced Valmont in the Jackie Chan Adventures cartoon (Seasons 1 and 2) (succeeded by the British actors Andrew Ableson and Greg Ellis in the remaining seasons). He played the Doci of the Ori in two episodes of Stargate SG-1—in its ninth and tenth seasons (a role he reprised in the film, Stargate: the Ark of Truth). He played a college professor in a Season One episode of The L Word. In 2002, he starred in Stephen King's Rose Red. Sands portrayed Austrian ambassador Klemens von Metternich in the 2002 miniseries Napoléon. In the 2006 season of 24, he played terrorist Vladimir Bierko.

Sands played Jor-El, Superman's biological father on Smallville, and reprised the role in the series' final (tenth) season. In 2009, he played Reg Hunt in Bollywood Hero. In 2012, he played Alistair Wesley in the seventh episode of the second season of Person of Interest.

In August 2011, he appeared onstage at the Edinburgh Fringe Festival in A Celebration of Harold Pinter, directed by John Malkovich at the Pleasance Courtyard. The play transferred to, the Irish Repertory Theatre, in New York. His performance in the play was nominated for "Outstanding Solo Performance" for the 58th Annual Drama Desk Awards (2013).

In 2011, Sands appeared in the mystery thriller film The Girl with the Dragon Tattoo, an English-language remake of the original version, as the younger Henrik Vanger. In 2012, Sands voiced the character of DeFalco in Call of Duty: Black Ops 2. On 26 April 2013, it was announced that Sands would appear as Miles Castner, a wealthy international businessman during the eighth season of Dexter.

Personal life
From 1984 until 1987, Sands was married to Sarah Harvey, a British journalist and author. The couple had one son. On 22 September 1990, Sands married Evgenia Citkowitz – an American playwright, author and journalist who is the daughter of Israel Citkowitz and Lady Caroline Blackwood – after being introduced by John Malkovich, a friend of Sands. The couple have two daughters. Sands is fiercely protective of his family and rarely speaks about his wife or children in interviews.

From 2020 until his disappearance, Sands and his family lived in Los Angeles, California.

Disappearance
On 13 January 2023, Sands, a dedicated mountaineer, went missing while hiking in Mount Baldy, California, in the San Gabriel Mountains northeast of Los Angeles. , he has not been located, and police were investigating his whereabouts. The investigation was hindered by severe storms that occurred shortly after Sands went missing. His car was located on 18 January. On 19 January, it was reported that his three adult children had joined the ground search for their father, with his son Henry, along with an experienced climber, retracing the route his father is believed to have taken. According to reports, Sands' cell phone was last tracked from a ping on 15 January, with no further pings, suggesting it had run out of power.

Reports state there was "evidence of avalanches" in the region. A representative of the San Bernardino County Sheriff's Department confirmed: "The air search is being resumed, but we have not been able to resume a ground search yet due to icy conditions and a threat of avalanches." The Sands family put out a statement on the 11th day after Sands went missing, praising "the heroic search teams" and their efforts "on the ground and in the air to bring Julian home."

One of Sands' brothers, Nick, has been quoted saying: "I have come to terms with the fact he's gone and for me that's how I've dealt with it".

Filmography

Film

Television

Video games

See also
List of people who disappeared

References

External links

 
 The Guardian interview, 19 August 2000.

1958 births
2020s missing person cases
20th-century English male actors
21st-century English male actors
Alumni of the Royal Central School of Speech and Drama
English expatriates in the United States
English male film actors
English male television actors
English male video game actors
English male voice actors
Male actors from Leeds
Male actors from Yorkshire
Missing people
Missing person cases in California
People educated at Lord Wandsworth College
People from Otley